Pterodactyl is a 2005 American horror film that premiered on the Sci Fi Channel. The film is directed by Mark L. Lester.

Plot
At a pterodactyl's nest, several of the eggs hatch. 
A trio of hunters, scouting the Turkish–Armenian border are suddenly attacked by a pterodactyl. While defending themselves, they become outmatched and are all killed.

Michael (Cameron Daddo), and Kate (Amy Sloan), are leading a group of teenagers for camping and through a science expedition. The students are Gwen, Jason, Willis (Steve Braun), and Angie (Mircea Monroe). They stop at a Turkish forest and begin exploring, eventually discovering a dead pterodactyl and mounds of pterodactyl feces. While the others examine the spore, Angie wanders off and decides to go for a swim. When she jumps into the water, a pterodactyl appears and attacks her. She struggles to escape, and runs into Jason, who was searching for Angie. In the confusion, he moves to the lake to investigate. Upon reaching the lake, the pterodactyl drags him away. Angie tells the others that she was attacked by something that looked like a bird, but Michael dismisses the idea. Michael and Willis desperately go searching for Jason, but unnoticed by them, he has been killed.

That night, Captain Bergen (Coolio) and his squad sneak into the Russian camp and captures the terrorist Clarke, (Todd Kramer). Captain Bergen find Michael and his group camping, so they decide to follow them.

The next morning, while preparing to leave, Michael's jeep is ambushed by a group of Russian terrorists. When the pterodactyls attack, the group flees with Captain Bergen and his squad rescuing them. In the struggle, Gwen is killed by a pterodactyl while escaping. Michael questions their presence; Bergen says that he and his squad members have been assigned to capture a Russian terrorist by hand. While the group continue on foot, Angie shows her feelings to Willis, for his bravery.

A second wave of pterodactyls suddenly appear. During the attack, Angie is wounded and succumbs to her injury. Several soldiers are also killed, and Kate is snatched in the process. After the attack, Captain Bergen and the group continue, to find a shelter. Flocks of pterodactyls start raiding the shelter, bringing it down to pieces. The group, arms and defends themselves from the invaders. With the group gaining the upper hand, the remaining invading pterodactyls retreats. Willis and one of Bergen's remaining soldiers Zelasny are injured. They are told to remain at the shelter, while the rest journey to the nest to rescue Kate.

Later, Zelasny (Jessica Ferrarone), dies from her wounds and Willis is killed by invading pterodactyls. Meanwhile, in the nest, Kate grabs a soldier's walkie-talkie and contacts Bergen. She escapes the nest and runs over the group once again. When the rescue line is set up for Kate to cross, Serling (George Calil), travers and grabs Kate to swing to Michael. Serling slips off the rope, falling to the rocks below. Bergen salutes his soldier and runs off as Serling before succumbing to his injury, detonates the bomb, in the nest, killing all of the pterodactyls. As they get off the mountain, the last pterodactyl attack in revenge. Bergen fires a missile saying, "the music's coming down and guess what I'm your DJ", but is killed. Michael keeps the missile on target and finally kills the last flying reptile. As Kate and Michael share a kiss and walk away, an allosaurus emerges from the volcano's crater.

Cast
 Cameron Daddo as Professor Michael Lovecraft
 Coolio as Captain Bergen
 Amy Sloan as Kate Heinlein
 George Calil as Serling
 Steve Braun as Willis Bradbury
 Mircea Monroe as Angie Lem
 Jessica Ferrarone as Zelazny
 Todd Kramer as Clarke

Many of the characters are named after famous science-fiction and fantasy writers—Bradbury (Ray Bradbury), Burroughs (Edgar Rice Burroughs), Clarke (Sir Arthur C. Clarke), Donaldson (Steven Donaldson), Heinlein (Robert A. Heinlein), Herbert (Frank Herbert), Lem (Stanislaw Lem), Lovecraft (H. P. Lovecraft), Serling (Rod Serling), Yolen (Jane Yolen) and Zelazny (Roger Zelazny).

Location

Despite the dialogue indicating that the events are taking place on the Turkish–Armenian border (a dry, rocky, mountainous area), the landscape in the film is wooded forestland with open grassy knolls in the Czech Republic.

External links

 

2005 television films
Syfy original films
American science fiction action films
2005 horror films
Films directed by Mark L. Lester
Pterosaurs in fiction
American science fiction television films
2005 science fiction action films
Films about dinosaurs
2000s science fiction horror films
American action horror films
2005 films
Films shot in the Czech Republic
Films set in Turkey
Films set in Armenia
2000s English-language films
2000s American films